Macomb station is an Amtrak intercity train station in Macomb, Illinois, United States. There is one daily morning train to Chicago. In the evening, the return train continues on to Quincy, Illinois. The station is a brick structure constructed around 1913 by the Chicago, Burlington and Quincy Railroad as designed by the railroad's architect Walter Theodore Krausch.

Transit connections 
Go West Transit at City Center Bus Transfer and Amtrak parking across tracks on North Randolph Street.

The following Routes service the City Center Bus Transfer Facility:
Route 5 - Brown - Jackson Street Express
Route 10 - Amtrak
Route 12 - South
Route 14 - North
Route 15 - East
Route 16 - Northwest
Route 17 - Northeast
Route 18 - Southeast
Route 19 - Southwest
Route 24 - North
Route 26 - Summer Northwest

References

External links

Macomb Amtrak Station (USA Rail Guide -- Train Web)
Official list of Go West Transit routes that stop at Macomb station

Amtrak stations in Illinois
Macomb, Illinois
Former Chicago, Burlington and Quincy Railroad stations
Railway stations in the United States opened in 1855
Buildings and structures in McDonough County, Illinois
1855 establishments in Illinois